Ruillé-sur-Loir (literally Ruillé on Loir) is a former commune in the Sarthe department in the Pays de la Loire region in north-western France. On 1 January 2017, it was merged into the new commune Loir en Vallée.

The village has a medieval and Renaissance parish church but is dominated by the school and the mother house of the order of Sisters of Providence (which enjoys links with England, the Netherlands and Madagascar). The tall spire of the conventual church is visible at a distance.

See also
Communes of the Sarthe department

References

Former communes of Sarthe